Dion Graham is an American actor and narrator. As an actor, he has worked both on and off-Broadway, as well as in TV series and film. As of August 2022, he has narrated 249 audiobooks. He has earned a place on AudioFile magazine's list of Golden Voice Narrators, as well as Audible's Narrator Hall of Fame. Further, he has won 9 Audie Awards, 71 Earphone Awards, 3 Listen-Up Awards, and 1 Odyssey Award.

Book Riot called Graham "the best of the best" in audiobook narration, saying, "His voice is rich and emotive, making even the driest bits of a long biography or history come alive. His ability to inhabit characters seems limitless; his myriad character accents are always flawless."

Biography 
Graham grew up in Cincinnati and lives in New York City.

His on-screen acting career began in 1992 when played a role in Malcolm X. Throughout the 1990s, he appeared in other shows, such as Law & Order, and performed on- and off-Broadway.

Graham highlights two key moments in his life as being influential to his career as an audiobook narrator. First, a roommate of his requested that he record James Joyce’s story "The Dead" for a long road trip. Months later, Graham listened to the recording and found it "compelling;" he also remembered enjoying the process of recording the story. A few years later, Graham was performing a Tennessee Williams play at the Royal National Theatre when an acquaintance encouraged him to consider audiobooks. His first audiobook narration was published in 2000.

Since 2000, Graham has given voice to many Black characters and narrated classic works by African American authors, including Langston Hughes's The Weary Blues, Martin Luther King Jr.'s Letter from Birmingham Jail, James Baldwin's Going to Meet the Man, and Chester Himes's The Big Gold Dream.

Throughout his career as an audiobook narrator, Graham has continued to act both on- and off-screen, including television shows such as The Wire, The Good Wife, and Madam Secretary.

Awards and honors 
Graham has earned a place on AudioFile magazine's list of Golden Voice Narrators, as well as Audible's Narrator Hall of Fame. In 2012, Booklist honored him with a Voice of Choice award. He has been named Publishers Weekly's Narrator of the Year, and his narrations have landed on many "best of" lists.

Further, he has won 9 Audie Awards, 71 Earphone Awards, 3 Listen-Up Awards, and 1 Odyssey Award.

2000s

Awards

Best of the Year Lists

2010s

Awards

Best of the Year lists

2020s

Awards

Best of the Year lists

Selected narration

2000s

2010s

2020s

Filmography

References 

21st-century American actors
Actors from Cincinnati
Actors from New York City
Year of birth missing (living people)
Living people